Davina Sarah T Perrin (born 8 September 2006) is an English cricketer who currently plays for Staffordshire, Central Sparks and Birmingham Phoenix. She plays as a right-handed batter.

Domestic career
Perrin made her county debut in 2021, for Staffordshire against Worcestershire. In the 2022 Women's Twenty20 Cup, she was the fourth-highest run-scorer across the entire competition, with 242 runs at an average of 34.57. She made 87 from 75 deliveries in Staffordshire's victory over Berkshire.

Perrin was selected for the Central Sparks Academy in 2021, and scored a century during an intra-squad multi-day game in September. Later that month, Perrin was added to the full Central Sparks squad, and made her debut for the side on 10 September, in a Rachael Heyhoe Flint Trophy match against Sunrisers. She played four matches overall for the side that season, scoring 92 runs including a best of 43 made against South East Stars. In 2022, Perrin scored 137 runs at an average of 27.40 in the Rachael Heyhoe Flint Trophy, as well as playing six matches in the Charlotte Edwards Cup. In a Rachael Heyhoe Flint Trophy match against Sunrisers, Perrin scored 45 opening the batting and took 3/26 from her 5 overs. She also signed for Birmingham Phoenix in the 2022 season of The Hundred, becoming the youngest player in the competition at 15 years old. However, she did not play a match for the side. At the end of the 2022 season, it was announced that Perrin had signed her first professional contract with Central Sparks.

International career
In October 2022, Perrin was selected in the England Under-19 squad for the 2023 ICC Under-19 Women's T20 World Cup. She played four matches in the tournament, scoring 36 runs and taking two wickets.

References

External links

2006 births
Living people
Cricketers from Wolverhampton
Staffordshire women cricketers
Central Sparks cricketers